Zero Tolerance is a compilation album released by Karmageddon Media under the name Chuck Schuldiner. The album consists of demo tracks for the second Control Denied album and various Death demos and live recordings. This is Candlelight Records two CD version, but Karmageddon Media released these four Control Denied tracks and other Death material on one CD and the rest in a second disc.

Track summary
Disc 1: Zero Tolerance
Tracks 1-4 are working demo tracks of the new material for the second Control Denied album, tentatively titled When Man and Machine Collide
Tracks 5-7 are from the demo Infernal Death (1985)
Tracks 8-10 from the demo Mutilation (1986)

Disc 2: Zero Tolerance II
Tracks 1-5 are from the demo Death by Metal (1984)
Tracks 6-11 are from the demo Reign of Terror (1985)
Tracks 12-19 were recorded live at the After Dark Club, Texas, in 1990.

Track listing
Disc 1
"Track 1" – 8:57
"Track 2" – 6:57
"Track 3" – 7:33
"Track 4" – 7:09
"Infernal Death" – 3:01
"Baptized in Blood" – 4:47
"Archangel" – 3:21
"Land of No Return" – 3:09
"Zombie Ritual" – 4:49
"Mutilation" – 3:36

Disc 2
"Legion Of Doom" – 3:34
"Evil Dead" – 3:11
"Beyond the Unholy Grave" – 3:14
"Power of Darkness" – 2:29
"Death by Metal" – 2:16
"Corpse Grinder" – 2:55
"Summon to Die" – 2:26
"Zombie" – 3:03
"Witch of Hell" – 2:44
"Reign of Terror" – 2:15
"Slaughterhouse" – 2:25
"Living Monstrosity" – 4:10 (live)
"Pull the Plug" – 4:27 (live)
"Zombie Ritual" – 4:33 (live)
"Altering the Future" – 5:36 (live)
"Left to Die" – 4:38 (live)
"Spiritual Healing" – 7:45 (live)
"Defensive Personalities" – 4:46 (live)
"Mutilation" – 3:30 (live)

References

2004 compilation albums
Chuck Schuldiner albums